Tronchin may refer to:
 Théodore Tronchin (1709 – 1781), a physician from the Republic of Geneva
 Jean-Robert Tronchin (1710–1793), an attorney general of the Republic of Geneva
 Théodore Tronchin (theologian) (1582–1657), a Calvinist theologian in the Republic of Geneva

External links
 Tronchin in the Historical Dictionary of Switzerland.